Tomas Siroky (born ) is a former Czech male volleyball player. He was part of the Czech Republic men's national volleyball team. On club level he played for VK Ostrava.

References

External links
 profile at FIVB.org

1982 births
Living people
Czech men's volleyball players
Place of birth missing (living people)